Fort Pearce is a former defensive facility occupying part of Point Nepean, Victoria, Australia. It was part of a network of fortifications, commanded from Fort Queenscliff, protecting the narrow entrance to Port Phillip.

Fortifications
The fortifications were constructed between 1910 and 1916. Two open concrete gun pits for Mk VII guns were constructed in 1911 with a large underground magazine between the pits. A battery observation post and direction range finder were constructed above the magazine. The gun crews were based at nearby Fort Nepean.

World War I 
At the outbreak of World War I, additional men of the Royal Australian Garrison Artillery and Royal Australian Engineers were posted to Fort Nepean. Additional barracks were constructed at Fort Pearce and were named Pearce Barracks. The barracks consisted of officers' quarters, two huts for the NCOs and men, ablutions hut, a cook house and store, mess, office, workshop and parade ground. Some of the timber huts were clad with sheets of iron to protect against machine gun fire.

The guns at Fort Pearce never fired in anger. The only fatality at the fort was Gunner Walter Hargrave, who was killed when one of the guns misfired on 16 July 1916.

World War II 

Additional huts, a fuel store and a larger ablutions block were constructed at Pearce Barracks in 1939–1940. Machine gun and mortar pits were dug into the sand dunes around the fort and manned throughout the war by the 2nd Battalion Volunteer Defence Corps.

After the Japanese air attack on Rabaul in 1942, it was decided the exposed battery was vulnerable to air attack and the guns were moved to nearby Cheviot Hill. Since the concrete hoods at Fort Nepean restricted their arc of fire towards Fort Pearce, a 14 pounder Nordenfelt quick firing gun was mounted at Pearce to protect the barracks anchorage in Port Phillip.

Post-war 
The fort and barracks were not continuously manned after 1946. Pearce Barracks was used for Citizens Military Force and school cadet training. The barracks were closed in 1978 and fell into disrepair.

National Park 
Following the formation of Point Nepean National Park, parts of Fort Pearce are open to the public but Pearce Barracks remains closed for safety reasons. Parks Victoria removed asbestos buildings from the barracks in 2007 and installed interpretive structures and displays at the site.  The site is open to the visitors.

See also 
 Fort Queenscliff
 Fort Nepean
 South Channel Fort
 Swan Island
 Pope's Eye
 Jervois-Scratchley reports

Footnotes

References 
 Armament Establishment, Detail of Equipment for Forts at Port Phillip Heads, Garrison Service, NAA:B73656, 12094 1892/644A, National Archives of Australia.
 Drawings and plans of fortress installations — Port Phillip Defences, NAA:MP338/1, National Archives of Australia.
 Point Nepean National Park Fortifications, Conservation Plan, Department of Conservation, Forests and Lands, January 1990.
 Point Nepean Forts Conservation Management Plan, Parkes Victoria, July 2006.

External links

1911 establishments in Australia
1978 disestablishments in Australia
Forts in Australia
Military installations in Victoria (Australia)
Port Phillip
Tourist attractions in Victoria (Australia)